In the U.S. state of Wyoming, U.S. Highway 14 (US 14) runs east to west across the northern part of the state.  The road connects South Dakota on the east with Yellowstone National Park on the west.  It is mostly a two lane surface road except for several sections that it shares with Interstate 90.

Route description 

While the official western terminus of the road is at the Eastern gate of Yellowstone National Park, some commercially produced maps show US 14 within the park itself starting at a junction with U.S. Route 89 and U.S. Route 287 at West Thumb and following the northern shore of Yellowstone Lake.  From the park US 14 is co-signed with U.S. Route 16 and U.S. Route 20.  The roads lead east out of the Absaroka Range and down the Shoshone River valley to Cody.  Here, U.S. Route 14 Alternate (US 14A) splits north toward Powell, while US 14/16/20 continues east across the Bighorn Basin to Greybull.  At Greybull, US 16 and US 20 go south, while US 14 travels east to Shell, and the western slope of the Big Horn Mountains.  The road ascends a windy path through steep Shell Canyon and rejoins US 14A at the top of the range at Burgess Junction.  The road is designated as Bighorn Scenic Byway between Shell and Dayton on the eastern side of the mountain range.  On the east side of the Bighorns, the road merges with Interstate 90 and travels southeast to Sheridan, Wyoming.  From Sheridan, the road continues east, rejoining with US Route 16 near Clearmont.  The roads travel across the Powder River Country to Gillette, Wyoming where it joins again with Interstate 90 to Moorcroft.  From here, it diverges north from Interstate 90 briefly to junction with Wyoming Highway 24 with access to Devils Tower National Monument.  US 14 turns south and rejoins Interstate 90 which it follows to the eastern border of Wyoming and South Dakota.

History 

US 14 was originally planned to stop in Wall, South Dakota.  In 1936, the road was extended to the Wyoming border and US 16 was rerouted through Newcastle and the old US 16 was re designated as US 14.  Prior to 1940, US 14 followed the route currently serviced by US 14A through Lovell and Powell.  In 1940, the highway took over Wyoming Highway 520 between Burgess Junction and Greybull, and the old road was renamed Wyoming Highway 14.  Due to confusion, it was recommissioned as US 14A in 1965.  In the 1960s portions of the highway in the eastern part of the state became Interstate 90.

Major intersections

Related route 

U.S. Highway 14 Alternate is an alternate route for U.S. Highway 14 between Cody and Burgess Junction. At its west end in Cody, US 14 is concurrent with U.S. Highway 16 and U.S. Highway 20. This portion of the road is closed during the winter months. Intermediate towns on the highway include Powell and Lovell.

In the initial 1925 plan, roughly the west half of present US 14 Alternate, from Cody to U.S. Highway 310 in Deaver, was assigned the number U.S. Highway 220. However, two spurs of US 20 were added in Pennsylvania, and so US 220 became U.S. Highway 420 in the final 1926 plan.

Around 1933, U.S. Highway 116 was extended west from Sheridan to Deaver, then absorbing US 420 to end at Cody. Soon after, it became part of an extended US 14. US 14 was shifted south to its present alignment in 1940, and the old alignment became Wyoming 14 for a while, and was recommissioned as US 14 Alternate around 1965.

References

External links 

 Wyoming
14
Transportation in Park County, Wyoming
Transportation in Big Horn County, Wyoming
Transportation in Sheridan County, Wyoming
Transportation in Campbell County, Wyoming
Transportation in Crook County, Wyoming